Bdeogale is a mongoose genus that was proposed by Wilhelm Peters in 1850 based on a mongoose specimen collected in Mozambique. Bdeogale species have compact paws with four symmetrical toes, round ears and a blunt muzzle with a broad round and bare rhinarium. The genus contains four species that are primarily terrestrial and omnivorous and forage in dense vegetation.

Species

References

External links 

 
Mongooses of Sub-Saharan Africa
Taxa named by Wilhelm Peters